Solar power in Colorado has grown rapidly, partly because of one of the most favorable net metering laws in the country, with no limit on the number of users. The state was the first in the nation to establish a Renewable Portfolio Standard for its electric utilities.  

Colorado consumers typically obtain varying amounts of solar power from rooftop solar, community solar gardens, and larger solar farms.  Colorado is home to many solar installers which are ranked annually by the amount of power installed.  Several thousand people are employed in solar-energy-related activities throughout the state.  A few companies have attempted to establish solar panel manufacturing operations in Colorado:  including Abound Solar,  Ascent Solar, and Primestar Solar.  Colorado was the first state where Dow introduced some of the earliest solar shingles. 

The Colorado Solar Energy Industries Association (COSEIA), a state affiliate of the national non-profit Solar Energy Industries Association, supports solar use and industry growth through its efforts which include both business and residential consumer education.  The Interstate Renewable Energy Council is also a source for information on consumer protection, workforce development, and for other news affecting industry developments in the state.

Colorado's colleges and universities support educational and research programs in solar power science and technology,  and in the related interdisciplinary subjects of energy, environment, and sustainability.  Golden, Colorado is home to the National Renewable Energy Laboratory and to the Golden Field Office of the Office of Energy Efficiency and Renewable Energy, both of which are funded by the United States Department of Energy.  The Rocky Mountain Institute with offices in Boulder and Basalt in also especially dedicated to promoting efficient energy use within the world's rapidly developing economies.

Solar farms

The 7.7 megawatt (MWAC) Alamosa Photovoltaic Power Plant completed in 2007 in the San Luis Valley was one of the first utility-scale solar farms in the U.S. utilizing photovoltaics.   More than a dozen additional facilities sized between 5 and 50 MW came online throughout the state during the following decade.   The 120 MW Comanche Solar Project located near Pueblo is the state's largest solar farm as of year 2017.

Installed capacity

As of 2017, Colorado was the 12th largest solar state in the U.S., with nearly 1 gigawatt of cumulative solar capacity installed.

Generation

See also

Wind power in Colorado
Solar power in the United States
Renewable energy in the United States

References

External links

 Incentives and policies
New Developments 2019: Your HOA cannot prevent you from going Solar.  

Energy in Colorado
Colorado
Solar power in Colorado